The 2006 Valencia GP2 Series round was a pair of motor races held on 8 and 9 April 2006 at the Circuit Ricardo Tormo in Valencia as part of the GP2 Series. It was the first round of the 2006 GP2 season.

Classification

Qualifying

Feature Race

Sprint Race

Standings after the round

Drivers' Championship standings

Teams' Championship standings

 Note: Only the top five positions are included for both sets of standings.

Notes

References

External links 
 Official website of GP2 Series

Valencia
GP2